A Twisted Tale, also called Twisted Tales in editions with the complete series, is an anthology series of books based around alternate "What if" spins on classic Disney animated films. They are published by Disney-Hyperion, and written by different authors, including Liz Braswell, Jen Calonita, Elizabeth Lim, and Farrah Rochon.

Books

A Whole New World (2015)
Based on: Aladdin
Author: Liz Braswell
Release date: September 1, 2015
Scenario: “What if Aladdin had never found the lamp?”

Once Upon a Dream (2016)
Based on: Sleeping Beauty
Author: Liz Braswell
Release date: April 5, 2016
Scenario: “What if the Sleeping Beauty never woke up?”

As Old as Time (2016)
Based on: Beauty and the Beast
Author: Liz Braswell
Release date: September 6, 2016
Scenario: “What if Belle's mother cursed the Beast?”

Reflection (2018)
Based on: Mulan
Author: Elizabeth Lim
Release date: March 27, 2018
Scenario: “What if Mulan had to travel to the Underworld?”

Part of Your World (2018)
Based on: The Little Mermaid
Author: Liz Braswell
Release date: September 4, 2018
Scenario: “What if Ariel had never defeated Ursula?”

Mirror, Mirror (2019)
Based on: Snow White and the Seven Dwarfs
Author: Jen Calonita
Release date: April 2, 2019
Scenario: “What if the Evil Queen poisoned the prince?”

Conceal, Don't Feel (2019)
Based on: Frozen
Author: Jen Calonita
Release date: October 1, 2019
Scenario: “What if Anna and Elsa never knew each other?”

Straight On Till Morning (2020)
Based on: Peter Pan
Author: Liz Braswell
Release date: February 4, 2020
Scenario: “What if Wendy first traveled to Never Land with Captain Hook?”

So This is Love (2020)
Based on: Cinderella
Author: Elizabeth Lim
Release date: April 7, 2020
Scenario: “What if Cinderella never tried on the glass slipper?”

Unbirthday (2020)
Based on: Alice in Wonderland
Author: Liz Braswell
Release date: September 1, 2020
Scenario: “What if Wonderland was in peril and Alice was very, very late?”

Go the Distance (2021)
Based on: Hercules
Author: Jen Calonita
Release date: April 6, 2021
Scenario: “What if Meg had to become a Greek god?”

What Once Was Mine (2021)
Based on: Tangled
Author: Liz Braswell
Release date: September 7, 2021
Scenario: “What if Rapunzel's mother drank a potion from the wrong flower?”

Almost There (2022)
Based on: The Princess and the Frog
Author: Farrah Rochon
Release date: September 6, 2022
Scenario: “What if Tiana made a deal that changed everything?”

Set in Stone (2023)
Based on: The Sword in the Stone
Author: Mari Mancusi
Release date: March 31, 2023
Scenario: “What if Arthur wasn't meant to be king?”

When You Wish Upon A Star (2023)
Based on: Pinocchio
Author: Elizabeth Lim
Release date: April 4, 2023
Scenario: “What if the Blue Fairy wasn't supposed to help Pinocchio?”

Graphic novels

Part of Your World (2023)
Graphic novel version of the original book of the same name, adapted by Stephanie Kate Strohm. Will be released on June 13, 2023.

References

External links

Book series introduced in 2015
Disney Publishing franchises
American novel series
Young adult novel series
Young adult fantasy novels
American young adult novels
American thriller novels
Disney Publishing Worldwide
Dark fantasy novels